Lena Philipsson was released on 15 September 1995 and is an album from Swedish pop singer Lena Philipsson. Lena Philipsson and Torgny Söderberg wrote the songs. The album peaked at #10 at the Swedish album chart.

Track listing

Contributing musicians
Ulf Janson - guitar
Figge Boström - bass
Lasse Persson - drums

Chart positions

References

1995 albums
Lena Philipsson albums